"Masterpiece" is a 1973 soul single written by Norman Whitfield and performed by American vocal group the Temptations.

Background
Whitfield, who also produced the track, entitled it "Masterpiece" because he felt it was a perfect blending  of strings, horns, rhythm players, voices, studio tricks, and sweetening elements.  However, the word 'masterpiece' does not appear in the song's lyrics, which do not point to anything obvious from which to draw a title.  As with their Whitfield-produced hit from the previous year, "Papa Was a Rollin' Stone", the Temptations do not make their first appearance until after a long instrumental section.  This added to already building tension between the group and Whitfield and led some music writers to start referring to the Temps as "the Norman Whitfield Choral Singers".

Personnel
 Lead and background vocals by Dennis Edwards, Richard Street, Damon Harris, Melvin Franklin (song verses), and Otis Williams (spoken introduction)
 Instrumentation by the Funk Brothers

Chart history
Released from the album of the same title, the title track reached number seven on the Billboard Hot 100 singles chart and spent two weeks at number one on the Hot Soul Singles chart.  It was their last Top Ten pop hit with Motown Records, and perhaps the last such hit in their career, not counting "The Motown Song," their collaboration with Rod Stewart in 1991.

Chart positions

References 

1973 singles
The Temptations songs
Songs written by Norman Whitfield
1973 songs
Song recordings produced by Norman Whitfield
Motown singles